Jesse Daley (born 16 October 1997) is an Australian professional soccer player plays for Cavalry FC in the Canadian Premier League.

Early life
Daley grew up in Brisbane. He went to high school at Anglican Church Grammar School.

Career
Daley spent time at Queensland Academy of Sport before playing in the NPL with Brisbane Roar, and Melbourne Victory.
Ahead of the 2017 season Daley moved back to Melbourne joining National Premier Leagues Victoria side South Melbourne.
Following a trial, Daley signed a professional contract with United Soccer League side Seattle Sounders FC 2 (later rebranded as Tacoma Defiance) on 1 May 2018.
On 12 August 2020, the Defiance released Daley. Two months later, Daley joined his former youth club, Brisbane Roar.

Daley was signed to Cavalry FC on 14 December 2022.

References

External links

1997 births
Living people
Association football midfielders
Australian soccer players
Australian expatriate soccer players
Expatriate soccer players in the United States
Melbourne Victory FC players
Brisbane Roar FC players
South Melbourne FC players
Tacoma Defiance players
Cavalry FC players
National Premier Leagues players
USL Championship players
Australian expatriate sportspeople in the United States